Statistics of Croatian First League in the 1943 season.

First stage

City of Zagreb championship

City of Osijek championship
1 : HSK Gradjanski Osijek
2 : HSK Hajduk Osijek

City of Zemun championship
1 : HSK Zemun

City of Banja Luka championship
1 : HSK Hrvoje Banja Luka
2 : HBSK Banja Luka

City of Sarajevo championship
1 : SASK Sarajevo
2 : HSK Gjerzelez Sarajevo

Provincial Zagreb championship
1 : HRSK Zagorac Varazdin

Provincial Osijek championship
1 : HSK Bata Borovo

Provincial Sarajevo championship
1 : HSK Tomislav Zenica

Second stage

Group A

Group B

Group C

Group D

Play-offs
HASK Zagreb 4-0 ; 1-2 HSK Zemun
HSK Hajduk Osijek 0-4 ; 1-7 HŠK Građanski Zagreb
SASK Sarajevo 0-0 ; 0-3 HSK Concordia Zagreb
HSK Gradjanski Osijek 1-1 ; 1-4 HSK Licanin Zagreb

Final Stage

References
rsssf

Croatian First league seasons
Croatia
Croatia
1